Atelopus mandingues is a species of toads in the family Bufonidae.

It is endemic to Colombia.
Its natural habitats are subtropical or tropical moist montane forests, subtropical or tropical high-altitude grassland, and rivers.

References

mandingues
Amphibians of Colombia
Amphibians of the Andes
Amphibians described in 2001
Taxonomy articles created by Polbot